Howard Kenneth White (born  2 March 1954) is an English footballer, who played as a defender in the Football League for Manchester City.

References

External links

Manchester City F.C. players
Living people
English Football League players
Bangor City F.C. players
Association football defenders
1954 births
English footballers